Serhiy Ivanovych Aleksanov (born 12 February 1990) is a Ukrainian footballer who plays as a striker for Ukrainian Polissya Zhytomyr.

Aleksanov is a product of the Dnipopetrovskàs youth sport schools and spent time playing for different Ukrainian First League teams. In 2013, he signed a contract with FC Olimpik Donetsk.

References

External links
 
 

1990 births
Living people
Ukrainian footballers
Footballers from Dnipro
Association football forwards
FC Dnipro-75 Dnipropetrovsk players
FC Arsenal-Kyivshchyna Bila Tserkva players
FC Olimpik Donetsk players
FC Hirnyk-Sport Horishni Plavni players
FC Kremin Kremenchuk players
FC Kramatorsk players
FC Inhulets Petrove players
MFC Mykolaiv players
FC Polissya Zhytomyr players
FC VPK-Ahro Shevchenkivka players
Ukrainian First League players
Ukrainian Second League players
Ukrainian Amateur Football Championship players